The Korean Film Awards was a South Korean film awards ceremony hosted by the broadcasting network MBC from 2002 to 2010.

History
Originally named the MBC Film Awards, the ceremony was first established in 2002. It was renamed the Korean Film Awards in 2003. Votes were determined from a jury of 500 film professionals and 500 viewers selected through the internet, using a 7:3 ratio.

In 2009, failure to secure sponsors during the global economic recession resulted in the cancellation of that year's ceremony. It resumed in 2010, with Hyundai Motor Company as the main sponsor. But persistent financial difficulties regarding the production costs led MBC to abolish the awards in 2011.

Categories
Best Film
Best Director
Best Screenplay
Best Actor
Best Actress
Best Supporting Actor
Best Supporting Actress
Best New Director
Best New Actor
Best New Actress
Best Cinematography
Best Editing
Best Art Direction
Best Lighting
Best Music
Best Visual Effects
Best Sound
Best Short Film
Lifetime Achievement Award

Best Film

Best Director

Best Screenplay

Best Actor

Best Actress

Best Supporting Actor

Best Supporting Actress

Best New Director

Best New Actor

Best New Actress

Best cinematography

Best Editing

Best Art Direction

Best Lighting

Best Visual Effects

Best Music

Best Sound

Best Short Film

Lifetime achievement award

References

External links
 
Korean Film Awards at Naver 
Korean Film Awards at Cinemasie

South Korean film awards
Awards established in 2002
Munhwa Broadcasting Corporation
2002 establishments in South Korea
Annual events in South Korea